Josh Abraham is an American record producer, songwriter, and music executive. He has worked with artists including  P!nk, Thirty Seconds to Mars, Kelly Clarkson, Shakira, Weezer, Linkin Park, Velvet Revolver, Carly Rae Jepsen, Adam Lambert, Alkaline Trio, and Slayer.

His career began in the recording studio in the mid-1990s, as a self-taught musician, producer, mixer, and engineer. The first album he produced for a major label was Deadsy's self-titled debut album in 1997. As a client of The Firm, Inc. he became A&R and Staff Producer, leading to a similar role at Virgin Records where he teamed up with the likes of Thirty Seconds to Mars and Courtney Love.

Pulse Recording
In 2004, Abraham formed Pulse Recording, after purchasing the property which operated as Soundcastle Recording Studios for more than 25 years. Designed in 1967 by influential mid-century modern architect Carl Maston, the Pulse Recording headquarters consists of two redwood block and glass buildings on a one-acre lot, housing two recording studios and an office space. The building has received the prestigious American Institute of Architects award for quality of construction and design. Notable artists that have recorded on the property since its inception include: U2, Madonna, Paul McCartney, Beach Boys, Bruce Springsteen, Tupac Shakur, Billy Joel, Beastie Boys, Red Hot Chili Peppers, Dr. Dre, Herbie Hancock, and Mary J. Blige.

He went on to create Pulse Management and Songs of Pulse, both operating under the Pulse Recording umbrella with partner Scott Cutler. Since 2010, the company's client roster has co-written Katy Perry's "Teenage Dream", "California Gurls", "Last Friday Night (T.G.I.F.)" and "Part of Me", Taio Cruz's "Dynamite" Phillip Phillips' "Home" and Neon Trees' "Animal" and "Everybody Talks". Pulse Recording now operates two Recording studios, one based at its headquarters in Los Angeles, and one based in Burbank, California. In 2012, the company established a partnership with Creative Nation, the Nashville-based music management and publishing company owned by songwriter Luke Laird and his wife Beth Laird.

Select songwriting discography

Select production discography

Awards and nominations
Latin Grammy Awards
2011 - Album of the Year ("Sale el Sol") (Nominated)

References

External links

Record producers from California
American music industry executives
Year of birth missing (living people)
Living people
Place of birth missing (living people)